Francis William Bergstrom, Ph.D. (1897-1946) was an American professor of chemistry at Stanford University.

Bergstrom was born in Bloomington, Indiana on January 10, 1897, then moved to Stanford when he was 11 years old. He enrolled at Stanford and received a B.S. in 1918 and a Ph.D. in 1922, working with Edward Curtis Franklin. His postdoctoral work was undertaken at Clark University and Brown University, working with Charles A. Kraus. His independent career lasted 29 years at Stanford, during which time he wrote 70 peer-reviewed papers on nitrogen chemistry and served as an Associate Editor for The Journal of Organic Chemistry.

Bergstrom died of a fast-moving brain tumor when he was 49 years of age.  A memorial professorship, held currently by Paul Wender, bears his name.

Awards and honors 

 1934 - Guggenheim Fellowship
 1922-1925 - National Research Council (United States) postdoctoral fellow

References 

1897 births
Stanford University faculty
Organic chemists
1946 deaths
Stanford University alumni
Clark University people
Brown University staff